The Adults is the self-titled debut album by New Zealand supergroup The Adults. The album was released in June 2011 and spent 11 weeks in the New Zealand album chart, peaking at number four. In addition to Jon Toogood, the album included contributions from Shayne Carter, Anika Moa and Julia Deans.

The album was recorded in locations in Australia and New Zealand, including recording facilities The Lab and Tikidub Productions in Auckland, the Blue Room in Wellington and Stonefeather Studios in Featherston, as well as the homes of various band members in Auckland, Wellington, Melbourne, and Palmerston North.

The album was released with a Deluxe Edition; an iTunes Deluxe Edition with B-sides, remixes and videos; and a bonus edition which includes tracks from The Adults' June 2012 concert with the Christchurch Symphony Orchestra.  Three singles have been released from The Adults:  "One Million Ways", "A Part of Me" and "Nothing to Lose".

The Adults was nominated for Album of the Year at the 2012 New Zealand Music Awards

Track listing

References 

The Adults albums
2011 debut albums